Metascopus camerunicus is a species of beetle in the family Carabidae, the only species in the genus Metascopus.

References

Lebiinae